The men's 400 metres hurdles event at the 1970 British Commonwealth Games was held on 18, 20 and 21 July at the Meadowbank Stadium in Edinburgh, Scotland. It was the first time that the metric distance was contested at the Games replacing the 440 yards hurdles.

Medalists

Results

Heats
Qualification: First 4 in each heat (Q) and the next 4 fastest (q) qualify for the semifinals.

Semifinals
Qualification: First 4 in each semifinal (Q) qualify directly for the final.

Final

References

Heats results (p9)
Semifinals results (p11)
Australian results

Athletics at the 1970 British Commonwealth Games
1970